Pterocelastrus is a genus of flowering plants in the family Celastraceae containing 17 species.

Selected species 
Pterocelastrus arboreus Walp.
Pterocelastrus burmanni Walp.
Pterocelastrus dregeanus Sond.
Pterocelastrus echinatus N.E.Br.
Pterocelastrus tricuspidatus Walp.

 
Celastrales genera